Dola is a department of Ngounié Province in southern Gabon. The capital lies at Ndendé. It had a population of 6,979 in 2013.

Towns and villages

References

Ngounié Province
Departments of Gabon